Rexford Glacier is a glacier flowing northeast into the head of Wagoner Inlet on the north side of Thurston Island. Named by Advisory Committee on Antarctic Names (US-ACAN) after Aviation Radioman Phillip W. Rexford, PBM Mariner aircrewman in the Eastern Group of U.S. Navy Operation Highjump, which obtained aerial photographs of this glacier and adjoining coastal areas, 1946–47.

See also
 List of glaciers in the Antarctic
 Glaciology

Maps
 Thurston Island – Jones Mountains. 1:500000 Antarctica Sketch Map. US Geological Survey, 1967.
 Antarctic Digital Database (ADD). Scale 1:250000 topographic map of Antarctica. Scientific Committee on Antarctic Research (SCAR). Since 1993, regularly upgraded and updated.

References
 

Glaciers of Thurston Island